Physaria gordonii, commonly known as Gordon's bladderpod, is a species of plant in the family Brassicaceae distributed throughout the Southwestern United States and Northern Mexico. It is a winter annual wildflower, maturing between April and June. The plant normally grows in sandy or gravel deserts. The plants flowers are in a loose, raceme cluster, and are radially symmetrical. The plant is very similar to P. fendleri.

References

gordonii
Flora of Arizona
Flora of Chihuahua (state)
Flora of Coahuila
Flora of Durango
Flora of New Mexico
Flora of Nuevo León
Flora of San Luis Potosí
Flora of Texas
Flora of Zacatecas
Flora of the Great Plains (North America)
Taxa named by Asa Gray